Eva Sigg (born 17 October 1950) is a Finnish former butterfly, freestyle and medley swimmer. She competed at the 1968 Summer Olympics and the 1972 Summer Olympics.

References

External links
 

1950 births
Living people
Finnish female butterfly swimmers
Finnish female freestyle swimmers
Finnish female medley swimmers
Olympic swimmers of Finland
Swimmers at the 1968 Summer Olympics
Swimmers at the 1972 Summer Olympics
Swimmers from Helsinki
20th-century Finnish women